Weichel is a surname. Notable people with the surname include:

Alvin F. Weichel (1891–1956), American politician from Ohio
Daniel Weichel (born 1984), German mixed martial artist
Nicolai Weichel (born 1997), Danish ice hockey player
Oscar Weichel (1894–1968), Canadian federal politician
Per Weichel (born 1942), Danish sports shooter
William George Weichel (1870–1949), Canadian merchant and politician